Moel Hebog (Welsh  for Bare Hill of the Hawk) is a mountain in Snowdonia, north Wales which dominates the view west from the village of Beddgelert. It gives name to a whole range of peaks in the north-western corner of Snowdonia, which include the Nantlle Ridge and Mynydd Mawr.

From that side, Moel Hebog has a rocky face with a distinctive pointed summit, although from other sides, it appears more rounded. The exposed rock means that it is often visited by students of geology. Much of the mountain consists of welded, fiamme rich rhyolitic tuff.

It is often climbed from Beddgelert and it can be combined with the nearby mountains of Moel yr Ogof and Moel Lefn for a longer walk. This route, however, does involve some easy scrambling.

On Moel yr Ogof can be found Owain Glyndŵr's Cave.
 The view of Moel Hebog and Llyn Gwynant from the north near Snowdon is one of the most photographed in Snowdonia.

A late Bronze Age shield was found in a bog near Moel Hebog in 1784. It is now in the British Museum's collection.

References

The Moel Hebog Group

The Moel Hebog Group contains the following (main) summits:

 Moel Hebog — Marilyn
 Craig Cwm Silyn — Marilyn
 Trum y Ddysgl — Marilyn
 Garnedd Goch
 Mynydd Mawr — Marilyn
 Mynydd Drws-y-Coed
 Moel yr Ogof
 Mynydd Tal-y-Mignedd
 Moel Lefn
 Y Garn
 Mynydd Graig Goch
 Moel-ddu — Marilyn

External links
 Computer generated summit panoramas North South index
 Walking guide and photographs Moel Hebog from Beddgelert
 www.geograph.co.uk : photos of Moel Hebog and surrounding area

Beddgelert
Dolbenmaen
Mountains and hills of Gwynedd
Mountains and hills of Snowdonia
Sites of Special Scientific Interest in West Gwynedd
Hewitts of Wales
Marilyns of Wales
Nuttalls